Qué Tienes Tú is the third studio album by Spanish group DVICIO. It was released on April 28, 2017 by Sony Music Spain. The album includes a collaboration with artist Kany Garcia. The album contains lyrics in both Spanish and English.

Background
Dvicio announced that months earlier before the album came out that they were working on an album that they all have worked on during their time in Mexico. A place that showed them where you can feel happiness and the place to feel loved. During their middle of the year 2016 and ending of the same year received so much awards and recognitions for their hard work. The group's official Twitter page updated a photo that read "Nueva Musica, Muy Pronto. New Music Coming Soon." On January 29, 2017. The group has worked leading to the release of their album, which came out on April 27, 2017.

Singles 
The first single from the album was "Casi Humanos". A music video for the song was released on their official YouTube channel.

Track listing

Charts

Weekly charts

Year-end charts

Release history

References

2017 albums
Spanish-language albums
Dvicio albums